Louis Edward Bols (29 July 1905 – 2 October 1957) was an Australian rules footballer who played with Fitzroy in the Victorian Football League (VFL).

Footballer

Coach
In 1932 he was the coach of the Old Scotch Football Club team that won the VAFA's A Section premiership, defeating State Savings Bank 13.18 (96) to 10.8 (68) on 17 September 1932.

He was appointed coach of the State Savings Bank VAFA team in the following season (1933).

Death
He died at his residence in St Kilda, Victoria on 2 October 1957.

Notes

References
 Players who are in the Public Eye: Lou Bols is a Ball of Energy, The Sporting Globe, (Wednesday, 8 May 1930), p.8.
 'Prefect's Fag', "Noted Men from Public Schools", The Sporting Globe, (Saturday, 10 August 1935), p.7.
 Amateurs: Brunswick, The Age, (Thursday, 1 May 1947), p.9.

External links 
 		
 
 Lou Bols, at the VFA Project.

1905 births
1957 deaths
People educated at Scotch College, Melbourne
Australian rules footballers from Victoria (Australia)
Brunswick Football Club players
Fitzroy Football Club players
Prahran Football Club players